Roman Sergeyevich Sharonov (born 8 September 1976) is a Russian football coach and a former player who played as a right back. He is the manager of SKA-Khabarovsk.

Club career
He played most of his career for FC Rubin Kazan.

International career
He played for the country at Euro 2004, receiving a red card during the 1–0 defeat by Spain.

Coaching career
On 6 June 2019, he was appointed caretaker manager of FC Rubin Kazan. As he did not possess the necessary UEFA Pro Licence at the time, but rather UEFA A Licence, he was formally registered with the league as an assistant coach, with Spanish coach Eduardo Aldama Docampo registered as the de jure head coach. He left Rubin by mutual consent on 16 December 2019, with the team in 13th place in the table.

On 6 June 2022, Sharonov was hired as manager of SKA-Khabarovsk on a two-year deal.

Career statistics

Club

International

Statistics accurate as of match played 25 May 2012

References

External links
 Player page on the official FC Rubin Kazan website 
 

1976 births
People from Mytishchi
Sportspeople from Moscow Oblast
Living people
Russian footballers
Russia international footballers
Russia under-21 international footballers
FC Yenisey Krasnoyarsk players
FC Rubin Kazan players
UEFA Euro 2004 players
UEFA Euro 2012 players
FC Akhmat Grozny players
FC Shinnik Yaroslavl players
Russian Premier League players
Russian expatriate footballers
Expatriate footballers in China
Russian expatriate sportspeople in China
Association football defenders
Russian football managers
FC Lokomotiv Moscow players
FC Rubin Kazan managers
Russian Premier League managers
Pafos FC non-playing staff
FC SKA-Khabarovsk managers
Russian expatriate sportspeople in Cyprus